Northern Low German (Standard High German: nördliches Niederdeutsch) is a variety of Low German. Its varieties in Germany are divided into Westniederdeutsch (lit. West Low German), Nordniederdeutsch (Northern Low Saxon), Nordostniederdeutsch (lit. North-East Low German, roughly corresponding to Mecklenburgisch-Vorpommersch) and Brandenburgisch. It borders to Low Franconian, High German and Southern Low German (südliches Niederdeutsch, i.e. Westphalian and Eastphalian).

Westniederdeutsch is quite atypical for dialects in Germany in general. There are radio stations mainly speaking Northern Low German in Paraguay, Brazil and Canada. In Germany, it is spoken about until the Ruhr area. It is spoken in several states of Germany. It is far more used in Frisia than in other areas, where it is spoken.
 
Most people in the area of Northern Low German do not speak this variety. In television in Germany, various varieties of Northern Low German are used. There are items in Northern Low German in daily newspapers. North Hanoveranian is spoken from Hamburg to North Rhine-Westphalia. East Pomeranian dialect is part of Northern Low German.
Plautdietsch is, if not a separate language, part of Northern Low German. 

 
There was a transitional area of Eastphalian and Brandenburgisch around Magdeburg. A transitional dialect of Mecklenburgisch-Vorpommersch and Central Pomeranian was spoken around Neubrandenburg. There was a Low German speaking transitional area between 
North Upper Saxon/South Markish and Brandenburgisch around Storkow, Brandenburg. Another, however High German speaking transitional area between North Upper Saxon/South Markish and Brandenburgisch around Frankfurt (Oder) used to exist. There is or used to exist a minor transitional area of Mecklenburgisch-Vorpommersch and Brandenburgisch. A transitional dialect area of Northern Low Saxon and Mecklenburgisch-Vorpommersch includes or used to include parts of Lübeck. A transitional dialect area of Brandenburgisch and Mecklenburgisch-Vorpommersch includes or used to include 
Dannenberg (Elbe). A transitional dialect area of Northern Low Saxon and Mecklenburgisch-Vorpommersch includes or used to include Lüneburg. There is or used to be a dialect area transitional to Eastphalian including Wunstorf. There is or used to be an area of transition to Eastphalian North of Celle.
A transitional dialect area of Eastphalian and Brandenburgisch is or used to be North of Wolfsburg.
Another transitional dialect area of Central Pomeranian and East Pomeranian roughly from Wolin (town) and Szczecin to about the border of the former Province of Posen used to exist. A transitional dialect area of Central Pomeranian and Brandenburgisch including Schwedt used to exist. 
East Pomeranian and Low Prussian dialect had a transitional area of each other. Places within this area included Bytów (Bütow), Lębork (Lauenburg), Bydgoszcz (Bromberg), Toruń (Thorn) and Przechówko. Within the respective area of Northern Low Saxon, East Pomeranian, Brandenburgisch and the transitional area of East Pomeranian and Low Prussian there was one language island each. Central Pomeranian had two language islands within its area.

References 

Culture of Lower Saxony
Low German
Languages of Ukraine